Down Here is a 2000 album by Tracy Bonham.

Down Here may also refer to:
Downhere, band
"Down Here" (it's Quiet Down Here), popular song composed by May Brahe, lyrics P. J. O'Reilly 1915
"Down Here", song from Body Head Bangerz: Volume One
"Down Here", song by John Grant from Grey Tickles, Black Pressure